Battle of Reading may refer to:

Battle of Reading (871)
Battle of Reading (1688)

See also
Siege of Reading (1642-1643)